The 2020 Berlin ePrix (formally the 2020 Berlin E-Prix presented by CBMM Niobium) was a series of six Formula E races held at the Tempelhof Airport Street Circuit at Tempelhof Airport in the outskirts of Berlin between 5 and 13 August 2020. It formed the final six races of the 2019–20 Formula E season and was the sixth edition of the Berlin ePrix.

The event was promoted as 9 Days, 6 Races, 3 Tracks, 1 Champion; and The Season Six Finale.

Report

Background
The Berlin ePrix was confirmed as part of Formula E's 2019–20 series schedule by the FIA World Motor Sport Council. It's the final six of twelve scheduled single-seater electric car races of the 2019–20 season, and the sixth running of the event. The ePrix was held using three different layouts at Tempelhof Airport Street Circuit at Berlin Tempelhof Airport between 5 and 13 August 2020. 

Entering the race, DS Techeetah driver António Félix da Costa was leading the Drivers' Championship with 67 points, followed by Jaguar's driver Mitch Evans in second 11 points behind, and third placed Andretti-BMW's driver Alexander Sims 21 points behind the championship leader. In the team's standings, Techeetah lead with 98 points, followed behind by Andretti-BMW with 90 and Jaguar down in 3rd with 66 points.

Circuit layouts
The track layouts for the 9 days event were made available to the drivers and constructors on 21 July 2020.

The 6 races were further split into three 'double headers', each with a different track layout. The first two races (5 and 6 August) were carried out in the reverse layout, with drivers driving the usual Tempelhof circuit in a clockwise direction (the circuit is normally driven in anti-clockwise direction). The second double header (8 and 9 August) were driven in the traditional Tempelhof circuit layout (i.e. anti-clockwise direction). The last double header (12 and 13 August) use an extended circuit layout, with more turns added to the middle and final sectors of the track. Organizers billed this track layout as 'more technical'.

Classification

Race 1

Qualifying

Notes:
  – Oliver Rowland received a twenty-place grid penalty for inverter/MCU change. He also received a forty-place grid penalty for gearbox and inverter change, forcing him to start from the back of the grid For being unable to take the full grid drop (by only losing sixteen places on the grid), he received an additional 10 seconds stop and go penalty at the race.
  – James Calado received a sixty-place grid penalty for battery, inverter and MGU change, forcing him to start from the back of the grid. For being unable to take the full grid drop, he also received an additional 10 seconds stop and go penalty at the race.

Race

Notes:
  – Pole position, fastest in group stage, and fastest lap.
  – Oliver Rowland received a five-second time penalty for being unable to take the full grid drop at the start.
  – Edoardo Mortara received a drive-through penalty converted into a 18-second time penalty for causing a collision.
  – Daniel Abt received a five-second time penalty for speeding under Full Course Yellow.
  – Maximilian Günther (who originally finished eighth) and Sérgio Sette Câmara (who originally finished twentieth) were both disqualified from the race due to their energy used being over regulatory limit.

Standings after the race 

Drivers' Championship standings

Teams' Championship standings

 Notes: Only the top five positions are included for both sets of standings.

Race 2

Qualifying

Notes:
  – Alexander Sims received a twenty-place grid penalty for battery change.

Race

Notes:
  – Pole position.
  – Fastest in group stage.
  – Fastest lap.
  – Jérôme d'Ambrosio originally finished fifteenth, but was disqualified from the race due to his energy used being over regulatory limit.

Standings after the race 

Drivers' Championship standings

Teams' Championship standings

 Notes: Only the top five positions are included for both sets of standings.

Race 3

Qualifying

Notes:
  – Nyck de Vries received a five-place grid penalty for pushing his car on the track without permission from the stewards in the previous race.

Race

Notes:
  – Pole position, fastest in group stage.
  – Fastest Lap.
  – Nyck de Vries received a ten-second time penalty for causing a collision.

Race 4

Qualifying

Notes:
  – Sérgio Sette Câmara received a three-place grid penalty for causing a collision in the previous round.

Race

Notes:
 – Pole position, fastest in group stage.
 – Fastest Lap

Race 5

Qualifying

Race

Notes:
 – Pole position, fastest lap
 – Fastest in group stage.

Race 6

Qualifying

Race

Notes:
 – Pole position.
 – Fastest in group stage.
 – Fastest Lap.

Notes

References

|- style="text-align:center"
|width="35%"|Previous race:2020 Marrakesh ePrix
|width="30%"|FIA Formula E Championship2019–20 season
|width="35%"|Next race:2021 Diriyah ePrix
|- style="text-align:center"
|width="35%"|Previous race:2019 Berlin ePrix
|width="30%"|Berlin ePrix
|width="35%"|Next race:2021 Berlin ePrix
|- style="text-align:center"

Berlin ePrix
Berlin ePrix
Berlin ePrix
Berlin ePrix